"Dance" is a song by American singer Toni Braxton. It was written and produced by Braxton and Antonio Dixon for her tenth studio album Spell My Name (2020). The song was released as the album's second single on July 31, 2020. It peaked at number 17 on the US Adult R&B Songs chart.

Background
"Dance" was written Braxton and Antonio Dixon. Dixon noted that "Dance" is "for those that want to go rollerskating. It has some 70’s disco to it."

Music video
A music video for "Dance," directed by Mike Ho, was released online on August 4, 2020.

Track listings

Credits and personnel
Credits lifted from the liner notes of Spell My Name.

 Paul Boutin – engineer, mixing, percussion, vocal producer
 Toni Braxton – producer, writer, vocals
 Antonio Dixon – instruments, producer, writer
 Reginald Dozier – recording
 Demonte Posey – horns, strings 
 Herb Powers, Jr. – mastering
 Erick Walls – guitar
 Benjamin Wright – strings

Charts

Release history

References

2020 singles
2020 songs
Toni Braxton songs
Island Records singles
Songs written by Antonio Dixon (songwriter)
Songs written by Toni Braxton